The British Columbia Human Rights Tribunal is a quasi-judicial human rights body in British Columbia, Canada. It was established under British Columbia's Human Rights Code. It is responsible for "accepting, screening, mediating and adjudicating human rights complaints."

History 
Responsibility for the province's Human Rights Code was originally divided between the BC Human Rights Commission, which was responsible for investigation and compliance, and the Tribunal, which was solely an adjudicative body. In 2003, the government of Gordon Campbell abolished the Commission as well as the BC Human Rights Advisory Council as a cost-saving measure while expanding the responsibilities of the Tribunal. In 2018, however, changes to the Human Rights Code re-established British Columbia's Human Rights Commissioner, this time as an independent officer of the Legislature, to address issues of systemic discrimination, including by intervening in Tribunal proceedings.

Notable cases

Smith v. Knights of Columbus 

In 2005, a Knights of Columbus council in Port Coquitlam, BC, was fined $1,000, after the Council's Hall Manager signed a contract for the use of their facilities and then canceled when they became aware that it was for a same-sex wedding reception. The two women said they were unaware that the facility was affiliated with the Catholic Church. The tribunal ruled the Council was within its rights to refuse to rent it based on their religious convictions but fined them "for injury to dignity, feelings and self-respect" of the women.

Datt v. McDonald’s Restaurants
In 2007, McDonald’s Restaurants of Canada was ordered to pay an employee $50,000 plus interest to compensate her for lost income, dignity and self-respect. The employee was a long-time employee at a Vancouver McDonald's restaurant who eventually acquired a skin condition which made hand washing painful. McDonald's corporate policy, BC's Health Act and its Food Premises Regulation, along with the BC Centre for Disease Control, require or recommend rigorous hygiene policies on the part of food handlers. At McDonald's restaurants all staff members, including the manager, are required to handle food. McDonald's granted the employee disability leave three times while she consulted doctors and tried various lotions, but after two and on half years, the employee was dismissed from her job. The tribunal ruled McDonald's had not done enough to accommodate her skin condition.

Eva v. Spruce Hill Resort
In 2018, the Tribunal awarded over $173,000 in total to seven former employees of the Spruce Hill Resort and Spa in Cariboo, who said the owner discriminated against them because they were Caucasian. Tribunal chair Diana Juricevic found "that over a period of months, the owner repeatedly said that he wanted to replace Caucasian employees with ethnically Chinese employees to reduce labour costs." All the complainants had either quit or were fired in August 2016.

Yaniv v. Various Waxing Salons

In 2018, Jessica Yaniv filed discrimination complaints against 13 waxing salons alleging that they refused to provide Brazilian waxes to her because she is transgender. In their defence, estheticians said they lacked training on waxing male genitalia and they were not comfortable doing so for personal or religious reasons. Thus, for them, being transgender was not the issue, but having male genitalia. Oral arguments were heard on five separate dates in July 2019. The case garnered significant international attention, including a segment on Tucker Carlson's Fox News channel show. It was also cited as a factor in the Australian Liberal-National Coalition's decision to oppose a proposed gender self-identification law in Victoria, Australia.

In October 2019, the Tribunal ruled against Yaniv and ordered her to pay $6,000 in restitution split equally among three of the female service providers. The ruling was critical of Yaniv, stating that she "targeted small businesses, manufactured the conditions for a human rights complaint, and then leveraged that complaint to pursue a financial settlement from parties who were unsophisticated and unlikely to mount a proper defence", and admonished her for using human rights law as a "weapon" to "penalize" marginalized women with a racial animus and for filing in such a volume for financial gain. For this reason, the court ruled not only that, since none of the salons advertised waxing services for male genitals, they did not discriminate against Yaniv on the basis of her gender identity, but also rejected the complaint regarding the refusal to wax Yaniv's arms and legs. Yaniv's application for the tribunal to reconsider its decision was denied.

On January 7, 2020, the Justice Centre for Constitutional Freedoms, which had represented three of the respondents, announced it was representing another salon in an additional complaint filed by Yaniv in early October 2019.

In August 2020, Yaniv filed a civil suit against the three previous respondents for $11,800.

See also 
Canadian Human Rights Tribunal
Canadian Human Rights Commission
Saskatchewan Human Rights Commission
Alberta Human Rights Commission

References

External links
BC Human Rights Tribunal

British Columbia law
British Columbia government departments and agencies